Cheshmeh Qaleh (also Romanized as Cheshmeh Qal‘eh) is a village in Satar Rural District, Kolyai District, Sonqor County, Kermanshah Province, Iran. At the 2006 census, its population was 37, in 11 families.

References 

Populated places in Sonqor County